Cassidi is an Israeli clothing company specializing in women's fashion.

History
The chain has 35 stores, with locations in Israel and Bulgaria. It is owned by the Cassidi and Ben Shitrit families. In 2010, the chain expanded its activity in Eastern Europe with a third store in a new outlet mall in the Bulgarian capital of Sofia.

Spokesmodels 
Linda Vojtová

See also
Israeli fashion
Economy of Israel

References

External links
 

Clothing brands
Clothing companies of Israel
Clothing retailers of Israel
Israeli brands